Pradhuman Singh Mall (born 10 October 1983) is an Indian actor and writer. He came to limelight after he played the role of a Saudi Arabian terrorist known for 9/11 attacks, Osama Bin Laden in the film Tere Bin Laden.

Singh starred in the movies Life Ki Toh Lag Gayi and Dilliwaali Zaalim Girlfriend. Besides his acting, he worked as a writer and cast in the sequel Tere Bin Laden: Dead or Alive. He wrote dialogues for Blackmail (2018) film starring Irrfan Khan.

Filmography

References

External links
 

1983 births
Living people